Lakei Heimuli (born June 24, 1965) is a former American football running back in the National Football League (NFL). He played one season with the Chicago Bears (1987).

Heimuli played college football as a running back at Brigham Young University (BYU) and lettered from 1984 to 1986. He rushed for 966 yards in 1986 as a senior and is second in all-time rushing yards with 2,710 yards. Heimuli is third all time in total touchdowns with 32 (30 rushing and 2 receiving. He attended Kahuku High School in Hawaii. He is distinguished as being the first Tongan to play in the National Football League.

Two of his five children have also played college football. Helam Heimuli played at Weber State University and Houston Heimuli is currently a fullback at Brigham Young University after completing his bachelor's degree at  Stanford University.

References

1965 births
Living people
American football running backs
BYU Cougars football players
Chicago Bears players
National Football League replacement players
People from Vavaʻu
Tongan players of American football
Tongan emigrants to the United States